Amelia Bedelia is the protagonist and title character of a series of American children's books that were written by Peggy Parish from 1963 until her death in 1988, and by her nephew, Herman, beginning in 1995. They have been illustrated by Wallace Tripp, Fritz Siebel, and the two current illustrators, Lynn Sweat and Lynne Avril. In 1992 HarperCollins republished the three original stories (Amelia Bedelia; Thank You, Amelia Bedelia; and Amelia Bedelia and the Surprise Shower) with illustrations by Fritz's daughter, Barbara Siebel Thomas.

There is a statue of Amelia Bedelia in Manning, South Carolina, Peggy Parish's hometown.

Many of the books are published as part of the I Can Read! series, levels 1 and 2.

Premise
The stories involve Amelia Bedelia's repeatedly misunderstanding various commands of her employer by taking figures of speech and various terminology literally, causing her to perform incorrect actions with a comical effect. For example, she interprets a request to "put the lights out" as a request to physically put the light bulbs outside. Part of the reason given for this behavior is that she comes from a family who takes everything literally: their method of ridding their house of dust is to "un-dust" rather than dust the furniture. However, she almost always manages to win everyone over at the end with her excellent cooking, particularly of desserts. Much of her employment is as a maid for a wealthy couple known as the Rogers, who are astute enough to realize her literalism and write their requests as "un-dust the furniture" and "put the wet towels in the laundry and replace them with clean dry ones", as opposed to simply "change the towels".

Authorship change 
Following Parish's death, children would send in fan letters asking about the continuation of the book series. Her nephew, Herman, felt uncomfortable to let her work be continued by someone not in the family. He then undertook authorship in 1995 with the full support of his family.

In 2009, Herman began writing books about Amelia Bedelia's own childhood experiences, starting with Amelia Bedelia's First Day of School, illustrated by Lynne Averill.

List of books

Adaptations 
Several theatre productions have been produced based on the series, including by the Serendipity Theatre Company in West Hollywood, California in 1994, the Omaha Theater for Young People in 2001, the San Diego Junior Theatre in 2002, the SCERA Theatre in Orem, Utah in 2008, and the Art Centre Theatre in Plano, Texas in 2011.

Universal Studios and Playtone partners Tom Hanks and Gary Goetzman reportedly bought the rights to produce a live-action feature film adaptation of Amelia Bedelia in 2005, but the project never materialized.

In 2021, an episode of This American Life featured a segment based on the character, reimagining her as working from home.

References

External links

 Amelia Bedelia Books official website

Children's fiction books
American children's book series
Literary characters introduced in 1963
Fictional maids
American children's books
Learning to read